Fire eating is the act of putting a flaming object into the mouth and extinguishing it. A fire eater can be an entertainer, a street performer, part of a sideshow or a circus act but has also been part of spiritual tradition in India.

Physics and hazards
Fire eating relies on the quick extinction of the fire in the mouth or on the touched surfaces and on the short term cooling effects of water evaporation at the surface on the source of fire (usually with a low percentage of alcohol mixed in the water) or saliva in the mouth. This allows for igniting a damp handkerchief or a bill of money without it burning. Closing the mouth, or covering it with a slap of the hand cuts off the oxygen to the fire. Blowing on it can remove the very thin area of reaction from the source of fuel, and thus extinguish the fire in some cases, where the blown air is faster than the fire front and the flame is small enough to be entirely removed.

The flame itself is not a cold flame, and the performers do not use any other material besides the fuel. Certain materials are avoided when doing the trick, such as materials which may easily ignite, melt or store the heat and release it later. These include paraffin candles, plastic, and thick multithreaded rope.

According to Daniel Mannix's 1951 sideshow memoir Step right up!, the real "secret" to fire eating is enduring pain; he mentions that tolerating constant blisters on your tongue, lips and throat is also necessary. Many other fire eaters dismiss this, claiming that skilled fire eaters should not burn themselves. The most common method of safely performing fire eating acts relies on the fact that it takes time to transfer heat, and that heat rises in air. Fire eating and fire breathing (and all variants) is a skill which should be passed on from a skilled master to an appropriate student and almost all teachings include instructions on first aid, fire safety, chemistry and other appropriate skills. Accidental ingestion of fuel or improper technique can lead to a serious condition known as fire eater's pneumonia.

History
Fire eating was a common part of Hindu, Sadhu, and Fakir performances to show spiritual attainment. It became a part of the standard sideshow acts in the late 1880s and was often seen as one of the entry-level skills for sideshow performers.

Although not the earliest, the first to attract the attention of the upper classes was an Englishman named Richardson, who first performed in France in 1667. Richardson "munched glowing coals, drank flaming liquids, and otherwise appeared to prove that he was unharmed by fire". His methods were subsequently made public by his servant.

A famous fire eater from the 18th century was Robert Powell who allegedly not only swallowed fire but also red-hot coals, melted sealing wax and even brimstone. He performed, often in front of British and other European royalty and nobility, for nearly sixty years and, in 1751, was awarded a purse of gold and a large silver medal. Other fire eaters include the magicians Ching Ling Foo and Daniel P. Mannix.

Guinness World Records

The most torches extinguished in one minute with the mouth (using multiple rods) is 99 and was achieved by Bret Pasek (U.S.) at the Minnesota Renaissance Festival in Shakopee, Minnesota, on 7 September 2014.

The longest duration fire torch teething is 3 minutes 38.39 seconds and was achieved by Alexander Spitfire (U.S.) at Circo Draconum's Draco's Inferno in Hell's Kitchen Lounge Newark, New Jersey on August 30, 2015.

Tricks
Trick categories are widely performed. Specific trick names may vary greatly depending on the country or artist.

Vapor tricks
Vapor tricks use the fuel vapors held in the mouth during or before an extinguish.
 Cigarette light – light a cigarette with a Human Candle
 Human candle – slowly feed a candle sized flame with vapors you hold
 Vapor transfer – ignite one torch with the vapor from another
 Moonshot – shoot vapors straight down
 Wel Kiss - A small amount of fuel on the palm of the hand is ignited by a steam pull, creating the effect of the performer blowing a kiss of fwater.

Transfers
Transfers are methods of moving a flame from one area to another, by using the body, or another surface or medium.
 Body transfers – transfer the flame from one torch to the other with parts of your body
 Finger transfer – transfer the flame from one torch to the other with your fingers (rarest form of transfer)
 Throat transfer – transfer the flame from one torch to the other with your tongue
 No transfer – throwing a lit torch at the audience
 Circus transfer – burning a circus by throwing a lit torch and pouring oil over it

Extinguishes
Extinguishes are methods of extinguishing torches, and are the traditional hallmark of fire eating.
 The Blow Out – Using breath control to extinguish
 Multiple fire eat – basic fire eat with several torches at once
 Flaming cotton ball extinguish – put out a cotton ball as you would a torch
 Hand snuff – put the torch out by snuffing it with your hand
 Jellyfish extinguish – pull the torch down out of the flame to extinguish it

Others
 Teething – hold a lit torch by the wick in your teeth
 Immolation – passing any part of the body through the flame
 Retention – Holding a lit fire torch by your hand with the lit wick within your mouth for an extended period of time
 Straight snuff – Fire eating whilst keeping your head level
 Tongue rest – Letting the lit wick of a fire torch rest on the tongue
 Shotgun – lighting a trail of fuel on the body to light an unlit fire torch.
 Fast burn – Very quickly dragging a lit fire torch on the skin

See also
 Fire breathing
 Fire performance
 Fire eater (disambiguation)

References

Further reading

External links

 Penn Jillette Reveals the Secrets of Fire-Eating, Smithsonian Magazine, December 2012 

Fire arts
Circus skills
Sideshow attractions
Articles containing video clips